Ririo is a nearly extinct indigenous language of Choiseul Province, Solomon Islands.

References

External links 
 ELAR archive of Ririo language documentation materials
 Paradisec has a number of collections with Ririo materials

Languages of the Solomon Islands
Endangered Austronesian languages
Northwest Solomonic languages
Critically endangered languages